John Luigi Mica (born January 27, 1943) is an American businessman, consultant and Republican politician who represented  in the U.S. House of Representatives from 1993 to 2017. He was defeated by Democrat Stephanie Murphy in the November 8, 2016, general election while serving his 12th term in office.

Early life, education, and business career
Mica was born in Binghamton, New York and grew up in Florida. He was educated at Miami Edison High School, Miami-Dade Community College and the University of Florida, where he received a degree in education and was a member of Delta Chi fraternity and Florida Blue Key. He has been a businessman serving in the real estate, telecommunications, government affairs and consulting fields.

Early political career 
Mica was a member of the Florida House of Representatives from 1976–80 and served on several committees, including the Appropriations Committee. He was a staff member for Senator Paula F. Hawkins from 1981–85 and became her chief of staff.

U.S. House of Representatives

Elections

1992 
In 1992, Mica ran for Congress in the 7th District, previously the 4th District represented by two-term Republican Craig T. James.

Mica won the Republican primary with 53% of the vote, defeating State Representative Richard Graham (34%) and Vaughn Forrest (13%). In the general election, he defeated Democrat Dan Webster 56%–44%.

1994–2004 
During this time period, he won re-election every two years with at least 60% of the vote.

2006 

Mica defeated Jack Chagnon 63%–37%.

2008 

Mica defeated Faye Armitage 62%–38%.

2010 

Mica defeated Heather Beaven 69%–31%.

2012 

For his first 10 terms, Mica represented a district that stretched from the Orlando suburbs through Daytona Beach all the way to St. Augustine.

After the 2010 Census, the bulk of Mica's territory became the 6th District. However, most of the Orange County portion, including Mica's home in Winter Park, was drawn into the new 7th District. That district had previously been the 24th District, represented by freshman Republican Sandy Adams.  Although the new 7th was over 58 percent new to Mica, he defeated Adams in the Republican primary with 61 percent of the vote.  In the general election, Mica defeated Jason Kendall 59%–41%.

2014 

Mica defeated Wes Neuman 64%–32%.

2016 

A court-ordered redistricting made the 7th slightly friendlier to Democrats. The new map cut out the district's share of Volusia County, while pushing it farther into Orlando.

The 7th had already been a marginal district, even though Mica had been elected twice from this district without serious difficulty. Mitt Romney narrowly won it over Barack Obama in 2012, with 51 percent of the vote. In contrast, had the redrawn 7th existed in 2012, Obama would have won it with 49.4 percent.

In the general election, Mica lost to Democrat Stephanie Murphy by a margin of 51%–49%.

Tenure

In November 1997, Mica was one of eighteen Republicans in the House to co-sponsor a resolution by Bob Barr that sought to launch an impeachment inquiry against President Bill Clinton. The resolution did not specify any charges or allegations. This was an early effort to impeach Clinton, predating the eruption of the Clinton–Lewinsky scandal. The eruption of that scandal would ultimately lead to a more serious effort to impeach Clinton in 1998. On October 8, 1998, Mica voted in favor of legislation that was passed to open an impeachment inquiry. On December 19, 1998, Mica voted in favor of all four proposed articles of impeachment against Clinton (only two of which received the needed majority of votes to be adopted).

Policy positions

Abortion
Mica opposes abortion. Regarding taxpayer funding of abortion through Planned Parenthood, he has said "I think the majority of Americans would oppose public, federal dollars going into abortion."

Economic issues
Mica voted against the 2009 stimulus. He has brought federal money for Florida highways, SunRail, the Veterans Administration Medical Center, and the University of Central Florida.

Transportation
Mica supports Amtrak privatization. In 2009, he earmarked $13 million for the Central Florida Commuter Rail, which was supported by a client of Mica's daughter.

Mica has been opposed to the federal government contributing any additional funds towards repairing the Washington DC Metrorail system.

Marijuana
As chairman of the House Oversight Committee's subcommittee on government operations, Mica convened a hearing on marijuana legalization in 1999. It was the first such hearing since 1988. Mica opposes the legalization of recreational marijuana.
Another such hearing was held by Mica in 2014 on the same subject, with multiple drug experts providing input.

Electoral history

Committee assignments
Mica was chairman of the House Transportation and Infrastructure Committee from January 3, 2011 to December 2012.

 Committee on Transportation and Infrastructure (former Chairman)
 Committee on Oversight and Government Reform
 Subcommittee on Information Policy, Census, and National Archives
 Subcommittee on National Security and Foreign Affairs

Personal life
Mica is married to Patricia, a schoolteacher, and has two grown children. He lives in Winter Park, Florida. He is the brother of former Representative Daniel A. Mica, while his other brother, David, is a former ranking staffer of Senator Lawton Chiles. He is a member of the Kennedy Center Board of Trustees and the Coast Guard Academy Board of Visitors.

References

External links
 
 
 

|-

|-

|-

1943 births
21st-century American politicians
American Episcopalians
Living people
Republican Party members of the Florida House of Representatives
Politicians from Binghamton, New York
Republican Party members of the United States House of Representatives from Florida
University of Florida College of Education alumni